Anthony Cox or Tony Cox may refer to: 

Anthony Cox (musician) (born 1954), American jazz bassist
Anthony Cox (producer) (born 1936/1937), American film producer and art promoter formerly married to Yoko Ono
Anthony Cox (sprinter) (born 2000), Jamaican sprinter
Anthony Berkeley Cox (1893–1971), English crime writer
Tony Cox (actor) (born 1958), American actor
Tony Cox (journalist), American radio and television journalist
Tony Cox (record producer), British record producer, arranger, orchestrator, composer
Tony Cox (South African musician) (born 1954), Zimbabwean guitarist

See also
Cox (surname)